Copper alloys are metal alloys that have copper as their principal component. They have high resistance against corrosion. The best known traditional types are bronze, where tin is a significant addition, and brass, using zinc instead. Both of these are imprecise terms, having both been commonly referred to as lattens in the past. Today the term copper alloy tends to be substituted, especially by museums.

Composition 
The similarity in external appearance of the various alloys, along with the different combinations of elements used when making each alloy, can lead to confusion when categorizing the different compositions. There are as many as 400 different copper and copper alloy compositions loosely grouped into the categories: copper, high copper alloy, brasses, bronzes, copper nickels, copper–nickel–zinc (nickel silver), leaded copper, and special alloys. The following table lists the principal alloying element for four of the more common types used in modern industry, along with the name for each type. Historical types, such as those that characterize the Bronze Age, are vaguer as the mixtures were generally variable.

The following table outlines the chemical composition of various grades of copper alloys.

Brasses

A brass is an alloy of copper with zinc. Brasses are usually yellow in colour. The zinc content can vary between few % to about 40%; as long as it is kept under 15%, it does not markedly decrease corrosion resistance of copper.

Brasses can be sensitive to selective leaching corrosion under certain conditions, when zinc is leached from the alloy (dezincification), leaving behind a spongy copper structure.
 Nordic Gold

Bronzes

A bronze is an alloy of copper and other metals, most often tin, but also aluminium and silicon.

 Aluminium bronzes are alloys of copper and aluminium. The content of aluminium ranges mostly between 5% and 11%. Iron, nickel, manganese and silicon are sometimes added. They have higher strength and corrosion resistance than other bronzes, especially in marine environment, and have low reactivity to sulphur compounds. Aluminium forms a thin  passivation layer on the surface of the metal.
 Bell metal
 Phosphor bronze
 Nickel bronzes, e.g. nickel silver and cupronickel
 Speculum metal
UNS C69100

Precious metal alloys
Copper is often alloyed with precious metals like gold (Au) and silver (Ag).

† amount unspecified

See also
Copper-clad steel
Copper alloys in aquaculture
Antimicrobial copper-alloy touch surfaces
Lubaloy C41100

References

Bibliography

External links
Corrosion tests and standards: application and interpretation
Copper Development Association

Copper Binary Phase Diagrams generation code (batch file - http://www.gotrawama.eu/copperNIMS/ramefabio.txt ) using open thermodynamic databases available at NIMS https://cpddb.nims.go.jp/cpddb/periodic.htm and a commercial software, Computherm Pandat, available for free at https://computherm.com/ ( help for use https://computherm.com/docs/pandat_manual.pdf. Images of the 34 binary phase diagrams are available at http://www.gotrawama.eu/copperNIMS/PNG/
 
Sculpture materials